The use of toxic chemicals as weapons dates back thousands of years, but the first large scale use of chemical weapons was during World War I. They were primarily used to demoralize, injure, and kill entrenched defenders, against whom the indiscriminate and generally very slow-moving or static nature of gas clouds would be most effective. The types of weapons employed ranged from disabling chemicals, such as tear gas, to lethal agents like phosgene, chlorine, and mustard gas. This chemical warfare was a major component of the first global war and first total war of the 20th century. The killing capacity of gas was limited, with about 90,000 fatalities from a total of 1.3 million casualties caused by gas attacks. Gas was unlike most other weapons of the period because it was possible to develop countermeasures, such as gas masks. In the later stages of the war, as the use of gas increased, its overall effectiveness diminished. The widespread use of these agents of chemical warfare, and wartime advances in the composition of high explosives, gave rise to an occasionally expressed view of World War I as "the chemist's war" and also the era where weapons of mass destruction were created.

The use of poison gas by all major belligerents throughout World War I constituted war crimes as its use violated the 1899 Hague Declaration Concerning Asphyxiating Gases and the 1907 Hague Convention on Land Warfare, which prohibited the use of "poison or poisoned weapons" in warfare.  Widespread horror and public revulsion at the use of gas and its consequences led to far less use of chemical weapons by combatants during World War II.

History of poison gas in World War I

1914: Tear gas
The most frequently used chemicals during World War I were tear-inducing irritants rather than fatal or disabling poisons. During World War I, the French Army was the first to employ tear gas, using 26 mm grenades filled with ethyl bromoacetate in August 1914. The stocks were rapidly consumed and by November a new order was placed by the French military. As bromine was scarce among the Entente allies, the active ingredient was changed to chloroacetone.

In October 1914, German troops fired fragmentation shells filled with a chemical irritant against British positions at Neuve Chapelle; the concentration achieved was so small that it too was barely noticed.
None of the combatants considered the use of tear gas to be in conflict with the Hague Treaty of 1899, which specifically prohibited the launching of projectiles containing asphyxiating or poisonous gas.

1915: Large-scale use and lethal gases

The first instance of large-scale use of gas as a weapon was on 31 January 1915, when Germany fired 18,000 artillery shells containing liquid xylyl bromide tear gas on Russian positions on the Rawka River, west of Warsaw during the Battle of Bolimov. Instead of vaporizing, the chemical froze and failed to have the desired effect.

The first killing agent was chlorine, used by the German military. Chlorine is a powerful irritant that can inflict damage to the eyes, nose, throat and lungs. At high concentrations and prolonged exposure it can cause death by asphyxiation. German chemical companies BASF, Hoechst and Bayer (which formed the IG Farben conglomerate in 1925) had been making chlorine as a by-product of their dye manufacturing. In cooperation with Fritz Haber of the Kaiser Wilhelm Institute for Chemistry in Berlin, they began developing methods of discharging  chlorine gas against enemy trenches.

It may appear from a feldpost letter of Major Karl von Zingler that the first chlorine gas attack by German forces took place before 2 January 1915: "In other war theatres it does not go better and it has been said that our Chlorine is very effective. 140 English officers have been killed. This is a horrible weapon ...".  This letter must be discounted as evidence for early German use of chlorine, however, because the date "2 January 1915" may have been hastily scribbled instead of the intended "2 January 1916," the sort of common typographical error that is often made at the beginning of a new year. The deaths of so many English officers from gas at this time would certainly have been met with outrage, but a recent, extensive study of British reactions to chemical warfare says nothing of this supposed attack. Perhaps this letter was referring to the chlorine-phosgene attack on British troops at Wieltje near Ypres, on 19 December 1915 (see below).

By 22 April 1915, the German Army had 168 tons of chlorine deployed in 5,730 cylinders from Langemark-Poelkapelle, north of Ypres. At 17:30, in a slight easterly breeze, the liquid chlorine was siphoned from the tanks, producing gas which formed a grey-green cloud that drifted across positions held by French Colonial troops from Martinique, as well as the 1st Tirailleurs and the 2nd Zouaves from Algeria. Faced with an unfamiliar threat these troops broke ranks, abandoning their trenches and creating an 8,000-yard (7 km) gap in the Allied line. The Entente governments claimed the attack was a flagrant violation of international law but Germany argued that the Hague treaty had only banned chemical shells, rather than the use of gas projectors.

In what became the Second Battle of Ypres, the Germans used gas on three more occasions; on 24 April against the 1st Canadian Division, on 2 May near Mouse Trap Farm and on 5 May against the British at Hill 60. The British Official History stated that at Hill 60, "90 men died from gas poisoning in the trenches or before they could be got to a dressing station; of the 207 brought to the nearest dressing stations, 46 died almost immediately and 12 after long suffering."

On 6 August, German troops under Field Marshal Paul von Hindenburg used chlorine gas against Russian troops defending Osowiec Fortress. Surviving defenders drove back the attack and retained the fortress. The event would later be called the Attack of the Dead Men.

Germany used chemical weapons on the Eastern Front in an attack at Rawka (river), west of Warsaw. The Russian Army took 9,000 casualties, with more than 1,000 fatalities. In response, the artillery branch of the Russian Army organised a commission to study the delivery of poison gas in shells.

Effectiveness and countermeasures

It quickly became evident that the men who stayed in their places suffered less than those who ran away, as any movement worsened the effects of the gas, and that those who stood up on the fire step suffered less—indeed they often escaped any serious effects—than those who lay down or sat at the bottom of a trench. Men who stood on the parapet suffered least, as the gas was denser near the ground. The worst sufferers were the wounded lying on the ground, or on stretchers, and the men who moved back with the cloud. Chlorine was less effective as a weapon than the Germans had hoped, particularly as soon as simple countermeasures were introduced. The gas produced a visible greenish cloud and strong odour, making it easy to detect. It was water-soluble, so the simple expedient of covering the mouth and nose with a damp cloth was effective at reducing the effect of the gas. It was thought to be even more effective to use urine rather than water, as it was known at the time that chlorine reacted with urea (present in urine) to form dichloro urea.

Chlorine required a concentration of 1,000 parts per million to be fatal, destroying tissue in the lungs, likely through the formation of hypochlorous and hydrochloric acids when dissolved in the water in the lungs. Despite its limitations, chlorine was an effective psychological weapon—the sight of an oncoming cloud of the gas was a continual source of dread for the infantry.

Countermeasures were quickly introduced in response to the use of chlorine. The Germans issued their troops with small gauze pads filled with cotton waste, and bottles of a bicarbonate solution with which to dampen the pads. Immediately following the use of chlorine gas by the Germans, instructions were sent to British and French troops to hold wet handkerchiefs or cloths over their mouths. Simple pad respirators similar to those issued to German troops were soon proposed by Lieutenant-Colonel N. C. Ferguson, the Assistant Director Medical Services of the 28th Division. These pads were intended to be used damp, preferably dipped into a solution of bicarbonate kept in buckets for that purpose; other liquids were also used. Because such pads could not be expected to arrive at the front for several days, army divisions set about making them for themselves. Locally available muslin, flannel and gauze were used, officers were sent to Paris to buy more and local French women were employed making up rudimentary pads with string ties. Other units used lint bandages manufactured in the convent at Poperinge.  Pad respirators were sent up with rations to British troops in the line as early as the evening of 24 April.

In Britain the Daily Mail newspaper encouraged women to manufacture cotton pads, and within one month a variety of pad respirators were available to British and French troops, along with motoring goggles to protect the eyes. The response was enormous and a million gas masks were produced in a day. The Mails design was useless when dry and caused suffocation when wet—the respirator was responsible for the deaths of scores of men. By 6 July 1915, the entire British army was equipped with the more effective "smoke helmet" designed by Major Cluny MacPherson, Newfoundland Regiment, which was a flannel bag with a celluloid window, which entirely covered the head. The race was then on between the introduction of new and more effective poison gases and the production of effective countermeasures, which marked gas warfare until the armistice in November 1918.

British gas attacks

The British expressed outrage at Germany's use of poison gas at Ypres and responded by developing their own gas warfare capability. The commander of II Corps, Lieutenant General Sir Charles Ferguson, said of gas:

The first use of gas by the British was at the Battle of Loos, 25 September 1915, but the attempt was a disaster. Chlorine, codenamed Red Star, was the agent to be used (140 tons arrayed in 5,100 cylinders), and the attack was dependent on a favourable wind. On this occasion the wind proved fickle, and the gas either lingered in no man's land or, in places, blew back on the British trenches. This was compounded when the gas could not be released from all the British canisters because the wrong turning keys were sent with them. Subsequent retaliatory German shelling hit some of those unused full cylinders, releasing gas among the British troops. Exacerbating the situation were the primitive flannel gas masks distributed to the British. The masks got hot, and the small eye-pieces misted over, reducing visibility. Some of the troops lifted the masks to get fresh air, causing them to be gassed.

1915: More deadly gases

The deficiencies of chlorine were overcome with the introduction of phosgene, which was prepared by a group of French chemists led by Victor Grignard and first used by France in 1915. Colourless and having an odour likened to "mouldy hay," phosgene was difficult to detect, making it a more effective weapon.  Phosgene was sometimes used on its own, but was more often used mixed with an equal volume of chlorine, with the chlorine helping to spread the denser phosgene. The Allies called this combination White Star after the marking painted on shells containing the mixture.

Phosgene was a potent killing agent, deadlier than chlorine. It had a potential drawback in that some of the symptoms of exposure took 24 hours or more to manifest. This meant that the victims were initially still capable of putting up a fight; this could also mean that apparently fit troops would be incapacitated by the effects of the gas on the following day.

In the first combined chlorine–phosgene attack by Germany, against British troops at Wieltje near Ypres, Belgium on 19 December 1915, 88 tons of the gas were released from cylinders causing 1069 casualties and 69 deaths. The British P gas helmet, issued at the time, was impregnated with sodium phenolate and partially effective against phosgene. The modified PH Gas Helmet, which was impregnated with phenate hexamine and hexamethylene tetramine (urotropine) to improve the protection against phosgene, was issued in January 1916.

Around 36,600 tons of phosgene were manufactured during the war, out of a total of 190,000 tons for all chemical weapons, making it second only to chlorine (93,800 tons) in the quantity manufactured:
 Germany 18,100 tons
 France 15,700 tons
 United Kingdom 1,400 tons (also used French stocks)
 United States 1,400 tons (also used French stocks)

Phosgene was never as notorious in public consciousness as mustard gas, but it killed far more people: about 85% of the 90,000 deaths caused by chemical weapons during World War I.

1916: Austrian use

On 29 June 1916, the Austro-Hungarian Army attacked the Royal Italian Army's lines on Monte San Michele with a mix of  phosgene and chlorine gas. Thousands of Italian soldiers died in this first chemical weapons attack on the Italian Front.

1917: Mustard gas

The most widely reported chemical agent of the First World War was mustard gas. Despite the name it is not a gas but a volatile oily liquid, and is dispersed as a fine mist of liquid droplets. It was introduced as a vesicant by Germany on July 12, 1917, weeks prior to the Third Battle of Ypres. The Germans marked their shells yellow for mustard gas and green for chlorine and phosgene; hence they called the new gas Yellow Cross. It was known to the British as HS (Hun Stuff), and the French called it Yperite (named after Ypres).

Mustard gas is not an effective killing agent (though in high enough doses it is fatal) but can be used to harass and disable the enemy and pollute the battlefield. Delivered in artillery shells, mustard gas was heavier than air, and it settled to the ground as an oily liquid. Once in the soil, mustard gas remained active for several days, weeks, or even months, depending on the weather conditions.

The skin of victims of mustard gas blistered, their eyes became very sore and they began to vomit. Mustard gas caused internal and external bleeding and attacked the bronchial tubes, stripping off the mucous membrane. This was extremely painful. Fatally injured victims sometimes took four or five weeks to die of mustard gas exposure.

One nurse, Vera Brittain, wrote: "I wish those people who talk about going on with this war whatever it costs could see the soldiers suffering from mustard gas poisoning. Great mustard-coloured blisters, blind eyes, all sticky and stuck together, always fighting for breath, with voices a mere whisper, saying that their throats are closing and they know they will choke."

The polluting nature of mustard gas meant that it was not always suitable for supporting an attack as the assaulting infantry would be exposed to the gas when they advanced. When Germany launched Operation Michael on 21 March 1918, they saturated the Flesquières salient with mustard gas instead of attacking it directly, believing that the harassing effect of the gas, coupled with threats to the salient's flanks, would make the British position untenable.

Gas never reproduced the dramatic success of 22 April 1915; it became a standard weapon which, combined with conventional artillery, was used to support most attacks in the later stages of the war. Gas was employed primarily on the Western Front—the static, confined trench system was ideal for achieving an effective concentration. Germany also used gas against Russia on the Eastern Front, where the lack of effective countermeasures resulted in deaths of over 56,000 Russians, while Britain experimented with gas in Palestine during the Second Battle of Gaza. Russia began manufacturing chlorine gas in 1916, with phosgene being produced later in the year. Most of the manufactured gas was never used.

The British Army first used mustard gas in November 1917 at Cambrai, after their armies had captured a stockpile of German mustard gas shells. It took the British more than a year to develop their own mustard gas weapon, with production of the chemicals centred on Avonmouth Docks. (The only option available to the British was the Despretz–Niemann–Guthrie process.) This was used first in September 1918 during the breaking of the Hindenburg Line with the Hundred Days' Offensive.

The Allies mounted more gas attacks than the Germans in 1917 and 1918 because of a marked increase in production of gas from the Allied nations. Germany was unable to keep up with this pace despite creating various new gases for use in battle, mostly as a result of very costly methods of production. Entry into the war by the United States allowed the Allies to increase mustard gas production far more than Germany. Also the prevailing wind on the Western Front was blowing from west to east, which meant the Allies more frequently had favourable conditions for a gas release than did the Germans.

When the United States entered the war, it was already mobilizing resources from academic, industry and military sectors for research and development into poison gas. A Subcommittee on Noxious Gases was created by the National Research Committee, a major research centre was established at Camp American University, and the 1st Gas Regiment was recruited. The 1st Gas Regiment eventually served in France, where it used phosgene gas in several attacks. The Artillery used mustard gas with significant effect during the Meuse-Argonne Offensive on at least three occasions. The United States began large-scale production of an improved vesicant gas known as Lewisite, for use in an offensive planned for early 1919. By the time of the armistice on 11 November, a plant near Willoughby, Ohio was producing 10 tons per day of the substance, for a total of about 150 tons. It is uncertain what effect this new chemical would have had on the battlefield, as it degrades in moist conditions.

Post-war
By the end of the war, chemical weapons had lost much of their effectiveness against well trained and equipped troops. At that time, chemical weapon agents inflicted an estimated 1.3 million casualties.

Nevertheless, in the following years, chemical weapons were used in several, mainly colonial, wars where one side had an advantage in equipment over the other. The British used poison gas, possibly adamsite, against Russian revolutionary troops beginning on 27 August 1919 and contemplated using chemical weapons against Iraqi insurgents in the 1920s; Bolshevik troops used poison gas to suppress the Tambov Rebellion in 1920, Spain used chemical weapons in Morocco against Rif tribesmen throughout the 1920s and Italy used mustard gas in Libya in 1930 and again during its invasion of Ethiopia in 1936. In 1925, a Chinese warlord, Zhang Zuolin, contracted a German company to build him a mustard gas plant in Shenyang, which was completed in 1927.

Public opinion had by then turned against the use of such weapons which led to the Geneva Protocol, an updated and extensive prohibition of poison weapons. The Protocol, which was signed by most First World War combatants in 1925, bans the use (but not the stockpiling) of lethal gas and bacteriological weapons. Most countries that signed ratified it within around five years; a few took much longer—Brazil, Japan, Uruguay, and the United States did not do so until the 1970s, and Nicaragua ratified it in 1990. The signatory nations agreed not to use poison gas in the future, stating "the use in war of asphyxiating, poisonous or other gases, and of all analogous liquids, materials or devices, has been justly condemned by the general opinion of the civilized world."

Chemical weapons have been used in at least a dozen wars since the end of the First World War; they were not used in combat on a large scale until Iraq used mustard gas and the more deadly nerve agents in the Halabja chemical attack near the end of the eight-year Iran–Iraq War. The full conflict's use of such weaponry killed around 20,000 Iranian troops (and injured another 80,000), around a quarter of the number of deaths caused by chemical weapons during the First World War.

The Geneva Protocol, 1925 

The Geneva Protocol, signed by 132 nations on June 17, 1925, was a treaty established to ban the use of chemical and biological weapons during wartime. As stated by Coupland and Leins, "it was fostered in part by a 1918 appeal in which the International Committee of the Red Cross (ICRC) described the use of poisonous gas against soldiers as a barbarous invention which science is bringing to perfection". The Protocol required that all remaining stockpiles of chemical weapons be destroyed. Chemical warfare agents that contained bromine, nitroaromatic, and chlorine were dismantled and destroyed. The destruction and disposal of the chemicals did not consider the long-term and adverse impacts on the environment. Although the Geneva Protocol banned the use of chemical weapons during wartime, the Protocol did not ban the production of chemical weapons. In fact, since the Geneva Protocol, the stockpiling of chemical weapons has continued, and weapons have become more lethal. As a result, the Chemical Weapons Convention (CWC) was drafted in 1993, which prohibits the development, production, stockpiling, and use of chemical weapons. Despite there being an international ban on chemical warfare, the CWC "allows domestic law enforcement agencies of the signing countries to use chemical weapons on their citizens".

Effect on World War II 
All major combatants stockpiled chemical weapons during the Second World War, but the only reports of its use in the conflict were the Japanese use of relatively small amounts of mustard gas and lewisite in China, Italy's use of gas in Ethiopia (in what is more often considered to be the Second Italo-Ethiopian War), and very rare occurrences in Europe (for example some mustard gas bombs were dropped on Warsaw on 3 September 1939, which Germany acknowledged in 1942 but indicated had been accidental). Mustard gas was the agent of choice, with the British stockpiling 40,719 tons, the Soviets 77,400 tons, the Americans over 87,000 tons and the Germans 27,597 tons. The destruction of an American cargo ship containing mustard gas led to many casualties in Bari, Italy, in December 1943.

In both Axis and Allied nations, children in school were taught to wear gas masks in case of gas attack. Germany developed the poison gases tabun, sarin, and soman during the war, and used Zyklon B in their extermination camps. Neither Germany nor the Allied nations used any of their war gases in combat, despite maintaining large stockpiles and occasional calls for their use. Poison gas played an important role in the Holocaust.

Britain made plans to use mustard gas on the landing beaches in the event of an invasion of the United Kingdom in 1940. The United States considered using gas to support their planned invasion of Japan.

Casualties
The contribution of gas weapons to the total casualty figures was relatively minor. British figures, which were accurately maintained from 1916, recorded that 3% of gas casualties were fatal, 2% were permanently invalid and 70% were fit for duty again within six weeks.

Death by gas was often slow and painful. According to Denis Winter (Death's Men, 1978), a fatal dose of phosgene eventually led to "shallow breathing and retching, pulse up to 120, an ashen face and the discharge of four pints (2 litres) of yellow liquid from the lungs each hour for the 48 of the drowning spasms."

A common fate of those exposed to gas was blindness, chlorine gas or mustard gas being the main causes. One of the most famous First World War paintings, Gassed by John Singer Sargent, captures such a scene of mustard gas casualties which he witnessed at a dressing station at Le Bac-du-Sud near Arras in July 1918. (The gases used during that battle (tear gas) caused temporary blindness and/or a painful stinging in the eyes. These bandages were normally water-soaked to provide a rudimentary form of pain relief to the eyes of casualties before they reached more organized medical help.)

The proportion of mustard gas fatalities to total casualties was low; 2% of mustard gas casualties died and many of these succumbed to secondary infections rather than the gas itself. Once it was introduced at the third battle of Ypres, mustard gas produced 90% of all British gas casualties and 14% of battle casualties of any type.

Mustard gas was a source of extreme dread. In The Anatomy of Courage (1945), Lord Moran, who had been a medical officer during the war, wrote:

Mustard gas did not need to be inhaled to be effective—any contact with skin was sufficient. Exposure to 0.1 ppm was enough to cause massive blisters. Higher concentrations could burn flesh to the bone. It was particularly effective against the soft skin of the eyes, nose, armpits and groin, since it dissolved in the natural moisture of those areas. Typical exposure would result in swelling of the conjunctiva and eyelids, forcing them closed and rendering the victim temporarily blind. Where it contacted the skin, moist red patches would immediately appear which after 24 hours would have formed into blisters. Other symptoms included severe headache, elevated pulse and temperature (fever), and pneumonia (from blistering in the lungs).

Many of those who survived a gas attack were scarred for life. Respiratory disease and failing eyesight were common post-war afflictions. Of the Canadians who, without any effective protection, had withstood the first chlorine attacks during Second Ypres, 60% of the casualties had to be repatriated and half of these were still unfit by the end of the war, over three years later.

Many of those who were fairly soon recorded as fit for service were left with scar tissue in their lungs. This tissue was susceptible to tuberculosis attack. It was from this that many of the 1918 casualties died, around the time of the Second World War, shortly before sulfa drugs became widely available for its treatment.

British testimony

A British nurse treating mustard gas cases recorded:

A postmortem account from the British official medical history records one of the British casualties:

Case four. Aged 39 years. Gassed 29 July 1917. Admitted to casualty clearing station the same day. Died about ten days later. Brownish pigmentation present over large surfaces of the body. A white ring of skin where the wrist watch was. Marked superficial burning of the face and scrotum. The larynx much congested. The whole of the trachea was covered by a yellow membrane. The bronchi contained abundant gas. The lungs fairly voluminous. The right lung showing extensive collapse at the base. Liver congested and fatty. Stomach showed numerous submucous haemorrhages. The brain substance was unduly wet and very congested.

Civilian casualties
The distribution of gas cloud casualties was not limited to the front. Nearby towns were at risk from winds blowing the poison gases through. Civilians rarely had a warning system to alert their neighbours of the danger and often did not have access to effective gas masks. When the gas came to the towns it could easily get into houses through open windows and doors. An estimated 100,000–260,000 civilian casualties were caused by chemical weapons during the conflict and tens of thousands (along with military personnel) died from scarring of the lungs, skin damage, and cerebral damage in the years after the conflict ended. Many commanders on both sides knew that such weapons would cause major harm to civilians as wind would blow poison gases into nearby civilian towns but nonetheless continued to use them throughout the war. British Field Marshal Sir Douglas Haig wrote in his diary: "My officers and I were aware that such weapon would cause harm to women and children living in nearby towns, as strong winds were common on the battlefront. However, because the weapon was to be directed against the enemy, none of us were overly concerned at all."

Countermeasures

None of the First World War's combatants were prepared for the introduction of poison gas as a weapon. Once gas was introduced, development of gas protection began and the process continued for much of the war producing a series of increasingly effective gas masks.

Even at Second Ypres, Germany, still unsure of the weapon's effectiveness, only issued breathing masks to the engineers handling the gas. At Ypres a Canadian medical officer, who was also a chemist, quickly identified the gas as chlorine and recommended that the troops urinate on a cloth and hold it over their mouth and nose, urine would be left to sit for a period so that the ammonia would activate, this would neutralize some of the chemicals in the chlorine gas, this action would allow them to delay the German advance at Ypres giving the allies time to reinforce the area when French and other colonial troops had retreated. The first official equipment issued was similarly crude; a pad of material, usually impregnated with a chemical, tied over the lower face. To protect the eyes from tear gas, soldiers were issued with gas goggles.

The next advance was the introduction of the gas helmet—basically a bag placed over the head. The fabric of the bag was impregnated with a chemical to neutralize the gas—the chemical would wash out into the soldier's eyes whenever it rained. Eye-pieces, which were prone to fog up, were initially made from talc. When going into combat, gas helmets were typically worn rolled up on top of the head, to be pulled down and secured about the neck when the gas alarm was given. The first British version was the Hypo helmet, the fabric of which was soaked in sodium hyposulfite (commonly known as "hypo"). The British P gas helmet, partially effective against phosgene and with which all infantry were equipped with at Loos, was impregnated with sodium phenolate. A mouthpiece was added through which the wearer would breathe out to prevent carbon dioxide build-up. The adjutant of the 1/23rd Battalion, The London Regiment, recalled his experience of the P helmet at Loos:

A modified version of the P Helmet, called the PH Helmet, was issued in January 1916, and was impregnated with hexamethylenetetramine to improve the protection against phosgene.

Self-contained box respirators represented the culmination of gas mask development during the First World War. Box respirators used a two-piece design; a mouthpiece connected via a hose to a box filter. The box filter contained granules of chemicals that neutralised the gas, delivering clean air to the wearer. Separating the filter from the mask enabled a bulky but efficient filter to be supplied. Nevertheless, the first version, known as the Large Box Respirator (LBR) or "Harrison's Tower", was deemed too bulky—the box canister needed to be carried on the back. The LBR had no mask, just a mouthpiece and nose clip; separate gas goggles had to be worn. It continued to be issued to the artillery gun crews but the infantry were supplied with the "Small Box Respirator" (SBR).

The Small Box Respirator featured a single-piece, close-fitting rubberized mask with eye-pieces. The box filter was compact and could be worn around the neck. The SBR could be readily upgraded as more effective filter technology was developed. The British-designed SBR was also adopted for use by the American Expeditionary Force. The SBR was the prized possession of the ordinary infantryman; when the British were forced to retreat during the German spring offensive of 1918, it was found that while some troops had discarded their rifles, hardly any had left behind their respirators.

Horses and mules were important methods of transport that could be endangered if they came into close contact with gas. This was not so much of a problem until it became common to launch gas great distances. This caused researchers to develop masks that could be used on animals such as dogs, horses, mules, and even carrier pigeons.

For mustard gas, which could cause severe damage by simply making contact with skin, no effective countermeasure was found during the war. The kilt-wearing Scottish regiments were especially vulnerable to mustard gas injuries due to their bare legs. At Nieuwpoort in Flanders some Scottish battalions took to wearing women's tights beneath the kilt as a form of protection.

Gas alert procedure became a routine for the front-line soldier. To warn of a gas attack, a bell would be rung, often made from a spent artillery shell. At the noisy batteries of the siege guns, a compressed air strombus horn was used, which could be heard nine miles (14 km) away. Notices would be posted on all approaches to an affected area, warning people to take precautions.

Other British attempts at countermeasures were not so effective. An early plan was to use 100,000 fans to disperse the gas. Burning coal or carborundum dust was tried. A proposal was made to equip front-line sentries with diving helmets, air being pumped to them through a 100 ft (30 m) hose.

The effectiveness of all countermeasures is apparent. In 1915, when poison gas was relatively new, less than 3% of British gas casualties died. In 1916, the proportion of fatalities jumped to 17%. By 1918, the figure was back below 3%, though the total number of British gas casualties was now nine times the 1915 levels.

Delivery systems

The first system employed for the mass delivery of gas involved releasing the gas cylinders in a favourable wind such that it was carried over the enemy's trenches. The Hague Convention of 1899 prohibited the use of poison gasses delivered by projectiles. The main advantage of this method was that it was relatively simple and, in suitable atmospheric conditions, produced a concentrated cloud capable of overwhelming the gas mask defences. The disadvantages of cylinder releases were numerous. First and foremost, delivery was at the mercy of the wind. If the wind was fickle, as was the case at Loos, the gas could backfire, causing friendly casualties. Gas clouds gave plenty of warning, allowing the enemy time to protect themselves, though many soldiers found the sight of a creeping gas cloud unnerving. Gas clouds had limited penetration, only capable of affecting the front-line trenches before dissipating.

Finally, the cylinders had to be emplaced at the very front of the trench system so that the gas was released directly over no man's land. This meant that the cylinders had to be manhandled through communication trenches, often clogged and sodden, and stored at the front where there was always the risk that cylinders would be prematurely breached during a bombardment. A leaking cylinder could issue a telltale wisp of gas that, if spotted, would be sure to attract shellfire.

A British chlorine cylinder, known as an "oojah", weighed 190 lb (86 kg), of which 60 lb (27 kg) was chlorine gas, and required two men to carry. Phosgene gas was introduced later in a cylinder, known as a "mouse", that weighed 50 lb (23 kg).

Delivering gas via artillery shell overcame many of the risks of dealing with gas in cylinders. The Germans, for example, used  artillery shells. Gas shells were independent of the wind and increased the effective range of gas, making anywhere within reach of the guns vulnerable. Gas shells could be delivered without warning, especially the clear, nearly odourless phosgene—there are numerous accounts of gas shells, landing with a "plop" rather than exploding, being initially dismissed as dud HE or shrapnel shells, giving the gas time to work before the soldiers were alerted and took precautions.

The main flaw associated with delivering gas via artillery was the difficulty of achieving a killing concentration. Each shell had a small gas payload and an area would have to be subjected to a saturation bombardment to produce a cloud to match cylinder delivery. Mustard gas did not need to form a concentrated cloud and hence artillery was the ideal vehicle for delivery of this battlefield pollutant.

The solution to achieving a lethal concentration without releasing from cylinders was the "gas projector", essentially a large-bore mortar that fired the entire cylinder as a missile. The British Livens projector (invented by Captain W.H. Livens in 1917) was a simple device; an  diameter tube sunk into the ground at an angle, a propellant was ignited by an electrical signal, firing the cylinder containing 30 or 40 lb (14 or 18 kg) of gas up to 1,900 metres. By arranging a battery of these projectors and firing them simultaneously, a dense concentration of gas could be achieved. The Livens was first used at Arras on 4 April 1917. On 31 March 1918 the British conducted their largest ever "gas shoot", firing 3,728 cylinders at Lens.

Unexploded weapons

Over  of France had to be cordoned off at the end of the war because of unexploded ordnance. About 20% of the chemical shells were duds, and approximately 13 million of these munitions were left in place. This has been a serious problem in former battle areas from immediately after the end of the War until the present. Shells may be, for instance, uncovered when farmers plough their fields (termed the 'iron harvest'), and are also regularly discovered when public works or construction work is done. After the armistice, people sought unexploded weapons for their metal value, as well as preventing the danger that they posed to civilians. Toxic chemicals were emptied from shells, resulting in many deaths and health defects.

Another difficulty is the current stringency of environmental legislation. In the past, a common method of getting rid of unexploded chemical ammunition was to detonate or dump it at sea; this is currently prohibited in most countries.

The problems are especially acute in some northern regions of France. The French government no longer disposes of chemical weapons at sea. For this reason, piles of untreated chemical weapons accumulated. In 2001, it became evident that the pile stored at a depot in Vimy was unsafe; the inhabitants of the neighbouring town were evacuated, and the pile moved, using refrigerated trucks and under heavy guard, to a military camp in Suippes. The capacity of the plant is meant to be 25 tons per year (extensible to 80 tons at the beginning), for a lifetime of 30 years.

Germany has to deal with unexploded ammunition and polluted lands resulting from the explosion of an ammunition train in 1919.

Aside from unexploded shells, there have been claims that poison residues have remained in the local environment for an extended period, though this is unconfirmed; well known but unverified anecdotes claim that as late as the 1960s trees in the area retained enough mustard gas residue to injure farmers or construction workers who were clearing them.

Disposal methods of chemical weapons 

After World War I, the United States, Germany, the United Kingdom and other nations had stockpiles of unfired weapons. It has been estimated that 125 million tons of toxic gases were used to manufacture bombs, grenades and shells. The remaining weapons were destroyed, dismantled, and disposed of in oceans and seas. It was believed that the chemicals would be diluted when disposed of in the ocean, and therefore ocean and sea dumping was a “safe and convenient” practice. Hundreds of thousands of tons of chemical agents, such as sulphur mustard, cyanogen chloride and arsine oil, were disposed of at sea. Chemical weapons have since washed up on shorelines and been found by fishers, causing injuries and, in some cases, death. Other disposal methods included land burials and incineration. After World War 1, “chemical shells made up 35 percent of French and German ammunition supplies, 25 percent British and 20 percent American”. Weapons that contained chemicals such as bromine, chlorine and nitroaromatic were burned. The thermal destruction of chemical weapons negatively impacted the ecological environment of disposal sites. For example, in Verdun, France, the thermal destruction of weapons “resulted in severe metal contamination of upper 4-10 cm of topsoil” at the Place à Gas disposal site.

Gases used

Long-term health effects

Soldiers who claimed to have been exposed to chemical warfare have often presented unusual medical conditions which has led to much controversy. The lack of information has left doctors, patients, and their families in the dark in terms of prognosis and treatment. Nerve agents such as sarin, tabun, and soman are believed to have the most significant long-term health effects. Chronic fatigue and memory loss have been reported to last up to three years after exposure. In the years following World War One, there were many conferences held in attempts to abolish the use of chemical weapons altogether, such as the Washington Naval Conference (1921–22), Geneva Conference (1923–25) and the World Disarmament Conference (1933). The United States was an original signatory of the Geneva Protocol in 1925, but the US Senate did not ratify it until 1975. 

Although the health effects are generally chronic in nature, the exposures were generally acute. A positive correlation has been proven between exposure to mustard agents and skin cancers, other respiratory and skin conditions, leukemia, several eye conditions, bone marrow depression and subsequent immunosuppression, psychological disorders and sexual dysfunction. Chemicals used in the production of chemical weapons have also left residues in the soil where the weapons were used. The chemicals that have been detected can cause cancer and can affect the brain, blood, liver, kidneys and skin. The development and production of chemical weapons threatened public health and introduced a new set of challenges. Not only did war gasses like mustard and chlorine endanger the lives of soldiers, but also threatened the safety of workers who manufactured them.

Explanatory notes

References

Further reading

External links
 Faith, Thomas I.: Gas Warfare, in: 1914-1918-online. International Encyclopedia of the First World War.
 Chemical Weapons in World War I
 Gas Warfare
 Gas-Poisoning, by Arthur Hurst, M.A., MD (Oxon), FRCP 1917 effects of chlorine gas poisoning
 Understanding Chemical Weapons in the First World War

World War I
Environmental impact of war
French war crimes
Italian war crimes
World War I chemical weapons
World War I crimes by Austria-Hungary
World War I crimes by Imperial Germany
World War I crimes by the British Empire and Commonwealth
World War I crimes by the Third French Republic
World War I crimes by the United States
United Kingdom chemical weapons program
World War I crimes
Military operations of World War I involving chemical weapons